Ringeldorf is a former commune in the Bas-Rhin department in Grand Est in north-eastern France. On 1 January 2019, it was merged into the commune Val-de-Moder.

See also
 Communes of the Bas-Rhin department

References

Former communes of Bas-Rhin
Populated places disestablished in 2019